David van der Kellen Sr. (1764, Velsen – 1825, Utrecht), was a 19th-century engraver and medallist from the Northern Netherlands.

Biography
According to van der Aa, he lost both parents at a young age and was brought up in the Lutheran orphanage in Haarlem. He chose to become a goldsmith and learned drawing, sculpting, and engraving, whereupon he went to work in Amsterdam for Holtzhey.
According to the RKD he was a pupil of Johann Georg Holtzhey in Amsterdam. He made medals for special occasions as well as official coins and became the mint master for the city of Utrecht. He was the father and teacher of David Jr. who succeeded him.

References

1764 births
1825 deaths
Engravers from Amsterdam
Dutch medallists
People from Velsen